The Laxmanpur Bathe massacre was a massacre conducted in the Laxmanpur Bathe village in Arwal district of Bihar, where 58 scheduled caste people were allegedly killed by members of the Ranvir Sena in retaliation for the Bara massacre in which 37 upper castes were killed. Laxmanpur Bathe is a village in Arwal district in Bihar, on the Son river about 90–km from Patna.

Killings 
The village was the site of a massacre of 58 Dalits allegedly killed by the upper-caste Ranvir Sena on the night of 1 December 1997. All the victims were Dalits and many among them were children, the youngest being a one-year-old, and pregnant women. To remove the last shred of evidence of their outrageous act, they crossed the river and slit the throats of the two boatmen who had rowed them, before disappearing in Bhojpur district. Laxmanpur-Bathe was targeted because Ranvir Sena members believed the village's Dalits, mostly poor and landless, were sympathizers of the Communist Party of India (Marxist–Leninist) Liberation behind the killing of 37 upper caste men in Bara in Gaya district in 1992.Ranvir Sena, a far-right wing militia of upper caste landlords, was created by Bhumihar caste to take on the Naxals

In the well-planned operation, about 100 Ranbir Sena activists carrying firearms had descended on Lakshmanpur Bathe at around 11 pm. They forced their way into huts by breaking open the doors and fired indiscriminately at people who were asleep. The entire hamlet located on the banks of the Sone river was virtually decimated in the attack that lasted more than three hours. The youngest victim was one year old.

The incident sent shockwaves across the country. The Lalu Prasad-led RJD government was then ruling the state. The then President K R Narayanan had expressed his shock and dismay over the mass murder of 58 Dalits in Central Bihar. In his strong-worded reaction, he had termed the massacre as "national shame".

Trial
In December 2008, charges were made against 46 Ranvir Sena men. Sessions Judge Mishra, on conclusion of trial in the case on 1 April, fixed 7 April 2010 as the date for announcing the verdict. Earlier, the case was transferred to Patna from Jehanabad following a Patna High Court order in October 1999.

On 7 April 2010, the Additional District and Sessions Judge Vijai Prakash Mishra of the Patna Civil Court sentenced 16 men to death and 10 to life imprisonment for the massacre. While pronouncing the verdict, sessions judge Mishra described the killings as a “stigma on civil society and rarest of rare cases of brutality.

On 9 October 2013, Patna High Court acquitted all 26 accused persons, due to "lack of evidence". The CPI (ML) staged a Bandh throughout central Bihar.

Reaction

Some commented that the High Court judgement did not get the attention it merited in the media. The acquittal of massacre-accused were overshadowed by another big news of that time - the retirement of Sachin Tendulkar from cricket. There was an angry reaction from the Bihar government and various political parties in the state. The government replied that it will appeal against the order, while CPI(M) termed the verdict as “unacceptable” and asked the Nitish Kumar government to immediately file an appeal against it. The CPI-ML criticised the state government and said that it would appeal in the apex court to appoint the SIT(special investigation team) probing all the massacre cases in Bihar. Other state parties LJP and RJD demanded CBI investigation in High Court's decision and alleged that the state government is protecting the interests of Ranvir Sena.

Maoists called for a 24-hour strike against the court's decision in Bihar's Muzaffarpur district, and the police advised that the banks and shops remain close. Seven people, including one suspected member from the Ranvir Sena, were killed in Aurangabad district on 18 October. The Dalits in the area feared that there may be a retaliation from the Ranvir Sena.

See also
Dalelchak-Bhagaura Massacre 1987
 1996 Bathani Tola Massacre
 Caste-related violence in India
 List of massacres in India

References

1997 crimes in India
Mass murder in 1997
December 1997 crimes
December 1997 events in Asia
1990s in Bihar
Massacres in 1997
Villages in Arwal district
Caste-related violence in Bihar
Dalit history
Massacres in India
Crime in Bihar
Caste-related violence in India